Benali may refer to:

 Abdelkader Benali (born 1975), Moroccan-Dutch writer and journalist
 Ahmad Benali (born 1992), Libyan football player
 Francis Benali (born 1968), English football player and coach
 Ghalia Benali (born 1968), singer of Tunisian origin
 Houssine Benali (born 1969) Moroccan former football player
 Youssef Benali (born 1995), French football player
 Youssef Benali (handballer) (born 1987), Tunisian-Qatari handball player
 Zine El Abidine Ben Ali (born 1936), former President of Tunisia

See also
Binali